Harold Elmore Bradshaw (November 5, 1898 – July 1975) was a Michigan politician.  He was a member of American Legion, Forty and Eight, Veterans of Foreign Wars, Freemasons and Elks.

Early life
Bradshaw was born to John P. H. Bradshaw and Winifred L. (Hurd) Bradshaw on November 5, 1898 in Davison, Genesee County, Michigan.  During World War I, he served in the U.S. Army.  On December 24, 1920, he was married to Retha D. Sheley.

Political life
The Flint City Commission select him as mayor in 1936 for two one-year terms.

References

1898 births
1975 deaths
American Freemasons
Mayors of Flint, Michigan
United States Army personnel of World War I
Michigan Republicans
20th-century American politicians